The 1955 Women's Western Open was contested from June 23–26 at Maple Bluff Country Club in Madison, Wisconsin. It was the 26th edition of the Women's Western Open and the first played at stroke play.

The tournament was won by Patty Berg, her fifth Western open title.

Final leaderboard

Source:

References

Women's Western Open
Golf in Wisconsin
Women's sports in Wisconsin
Sports in Madison, Wisconsin
Women's Western Open
Women's Western Open
Women's Western Open
Women's Western Open